James Benning may refer to:
James Benning (film director) (born 1942), American filmmaker
James Benning (cricketer) (born 1983), English cricketer
Jim Benning (born 1963), Canadian ice hockey player